Ramesh Venkata Sonti is an Indian plant Geneticist. He did his MPhil in life sciences from University of Hyderabad. He holds Doctor of philosophy in bacterial genetics from the University of Utah, supplemented with Post Doctoral training in Plant genetics from the Massachusetts Institute of Technology. He was positioned as a Senior Scientist at the Centre for Cellular and Molecular Biology in Hyderabad, India.
He was awarded in June 2004 the Shanti Swarup Bhatnagar Prize for Science and Technology, the highest science award in India,  in the Biological sciences category.

Prizes and honours
National Bioscience Award for Career Development of the Department of Biotechnology, Government of India.
Shanti Swarup Bhatnagar Prize for Science and Technology for 2004.

Research highlights
Virulence mechanisms of the important bacterial leaf blight pathogen of the rice plant.
Introduction of bacterial leaf blight resistance characteristics into the background of commercially important but disease susceptible rice varieties.

References

Living people
Scientists from Hyderabad, India
Recipients of the Shanti Swarup Bhatnagar Award in Biological Science
University of Utah alumni
Massachusetts Institute of Technology alumni
1960 births
Indian biotechnologists
20th-century Indian biologists
Indian geneticists
Telugu people
People from Andhra Pradesh
N-BIOS Prize recipients